Castel Madama is a  (municipality) in the Metropolitan City of Rome in the Italian region of Lazio, located about  east of Rome.

International relations

Castel Madama is twinned with:
 Oudenaarde, Belgium, since 1986
 La Roda de Andalucía, Spain, since 2002

References

External links
 Official website
 Castel Madama

Cities and towns in Lazio